Rolando Desembrana Aquino (May 2, 1942 – March 10, 2014) was a Filipino actor and director, best known for playing antagonist roles in films and television shows. He also became a Born-Again Evangelical Christian and he was ordained as a pastor of Jesus Lights the Way to the Father's Kingdom Church, Antipolo City, Officiated by Bishop Federico "Butch" Villanueva.

Career
Roldan Aquino is famous being a character actor. He starred in various films including Burlesk Queen (1977), Pikoy Goes to Malaysia (1988) and Lihim ni Madonna (1997). His final films before his death were Manila Kingpin: The Asiong Salonga Story (2011), Tiktik: The Aswang Chronicles (2012), and El Presidente (2012).

Death
He suffered a stroke in January 2014 and underwent surgery on January 20, 2014. He died on March 10, 2014.

Selected filmography

Film 

Cosa nostra (1965)
Cabonegro (1966)
Target Domino (1966)
Chinatown (1966)
Nasaan ang katarungan? (1969)
Ako'y tao, may dugo at laman! (1970) - Luis
Sex Sinners (1970)
Lover for Hire (1970)
Hey There, Lonely Girl (1970)
Triagulo (1970)
Marupok (1970)
Ina ko patawarin mo ako ako'y nagugutom (1970)
Isla de amor (1971)
Aida (1971)
Luray (1971)
Aliwan (1971)
Alimpuyo (1971)
Inday (1971)
Nunal sa balikat (1971)
Hamog sa katanghalian (1971)
Mapaglarong Pag-ibig (1971)
Ang Pangalan Ko'y Luray (1971)
The Big Bird Cage (1972) - Revolutionary (uncredited)
Kung Bakit Kita Minahal (1972)
Captain Barbell Boom! (1973)
The Game of Death (1974)
Sarhento Fofonggay: A, ewan! (1974) - Kapitan
Return of the Dragon (1974)
Bagsik at Kamandag ni Pedro Penduko (1974)
Dragon Fire (1974)
The Dragon Force Connection (1974)
Itong Panagupa (1974)
Basta't Isipin Mong Mahal Kita (1975)
The Magnificient Brute (1975)
O Anong Sarap (1977)
Kung May Tiyaga, May Nilaga (1975)
Jack and Jill and John (1975)
Romeo at Julio (1975)
Burlesk Queen (1977) - Ander
Atsay (1978) - Village Casanova
Scout Ranger (1979)
Bakit May Pag-ibig Pa? (1979) - Delfin
Superhand (1980)
Beloy Montemayor (1986)
Pikoy Goes to Malaysia (1988)
Jones Bridge Massacre (Task Force Clabio) (1989)
Isang Bala, Isang Buhay (1989) - Roldan
Amok: Patrolman 2 (1989) - Col. Barretto
Urbanito Dizon: The Most Notorious Gangster in Luzon (1990) - Col. Brandon
Ibabaon kita sa lupa (1990)
Delta Force 2: The Colombian Connection (1990) - Ramon's Bodyguard #3
Walang piring ang katarungan (1990)
Hanggang saan ang tapang mo (1990) - Lt. Mendoza
Alyas Pogi: Birador ng Nueva Ecija (1990) - Big Boy
Para sa Iyo ang Huling Bala Ko (1991)
Hindi palulupig (1991) - Hantik
Kapag Nag-abot ang Langit at Lupa (1991)
Magdalena S. Palacol Story (1991)
Markang Bungo: The Bobby Ortega Story (1991)
Mahal Ko ang Mister Mo (1991)
Kalabang Mortal ni Baby Ama (1991)
Ano Ba Iyan? (1992) - Don Peping
Estribo Gang: The Jinggoy Sese Story (1992) - Maj. Estrella
Warden (1992) - Warden Pajaron
Totoy Guwapo: Alyas Kanto Boy (1992) - Roldan
Lumayo Ka Man sa Akin (1992) - Fernan
Dudurugin Kita ng Bala ko (1992)
Canary Brothers of Tondo (1992) - Totoy Golem
Bukas Tatakpan Ka ng Diyaryo (1992) - Don Roman
Ang Siga at ang Sosyal (1992) - Don Luis Regalado / Manolo
Amang Capulong - Anak ng Tondo II (1992)
Ako ang Katarungan (Lt. Napoleon M. Guevarra) (1992)
Beloy Montemayor Jr.: Tirador ng Cebu (1993) - Sergeant Dimalante
Ikaw Lang (1993) - Sarge
Leonardo Delos Reyes: Alyas Waway (1993) - Roger Taba
Victor Meneses: Dugong Kriminal (1993)
Padre Amante Guerrero (1993) - Rocco
Mama's Boys (1993)
Astig (1993) - Major Aliño
Ano ba 'yan 2 (1993) - Don Peping
Ismael Zacarias (1994) - Maj. Roxas
Comfort Women: A Cry for Justice (1994)
Ka Hector (1994) - Delos Santos
Lucas Abelardo (1994) - Fiscal
Walang matigas na pulis sa matinik na misis (1994)
Tunay na magkaibigan, walang iwanan... peksman (1994) - Julio
Tigre ng Mindanao (1994)
Nagkataon... Nagkatagpo (1994) - Hepe
Mancao (1994)
Run Barbi Run (1995) - Gardo
Pulis Probinsya II (1995) - Cong. Dimasupli
Grepor "Butch" Belgica Story (1995) - Leader
Batangueno kabitenyo (1995)
Adan Lazaro (1996)
Utol (1996) - Ador
Kung marunong kang magdasal, umpisahan mo na (1996) - Col. Mora
Virgin People 2 (1996)
Tolentino (1996)
Makamandag na Bango (1996) - Karding
Boy Chico: Hulihin si Ben Tumbling (1997)
Wala ka nang puwang sa mundo (1997) - Castro
Tapatan ng tapang (1997)
Pusakal (1997)
Pablik Enemi 1 n 2: Aksidental Heroes (1997) - Señor Santiago
Lihim ni Madonna (1997)
Iskalawag: Ang batas ay batas (1997) - Toring
Buhay mo'y buhay ko rin (1997)
Bobby Barbers: Parak (1997) - Don Jose
Biyudo si daddy, biyuda si mommy (1997) - Bodji
Virgin People
Pagbabalik ng Probinsyano (1998) - Rodrigo
Guevarra: Sa batas ko walang hari (1998)
Ben Delubyo (1998) - General
Birador (1998) - Vergara
May sayad (1998) - Dr. Austria
Jesus Salonga, Alyas Boy Indian (1998)
Alyas Boy Tigas: Probinsyanong Wais (1998)
Notoryus (1998)
Ginto't pilak (1998)
Droga, pagtatapat ng mga babaeng addict (1999) - Don Peping
Kanang Kamay: Ituro mo, itutumba ko (1999) - Gene Zarate's Henchmen #2
Tigasin (1999)
Hey Babe! (1999) - Jose
Pepeng Agimat (1999) - Col. Dimayacyac
Antonio Cuervo - Police: Walang pinipili ang batas (2000)
Tunay na tunay: Gets mo? Gets ko! (2000) - Mr. Li
Col. Elmer Jamias: Barako ng Maynila (2000) - SPO2 Valdez
Daddy O, Baby O! (2000) - Samson
Kailangan Ko'y Ikaw (2000) - Tomas
Booba (2001) - Gen. Lee
Weyt a minit, kapeng mainit (2001)
Pagdating ng panahon (2001) - Tatay Manolo
Hari ng selda: Anak ni Baby Ama 2 (2002) - Director Reyes
Paraiso (2005)
You Are The One (2006)
Anak ng Kumander (2008) - Col. Aquino
Ang Tanging Ina N'yong Lahat (2008) - Senator
666 (2010)
Ang Babae sa Sementeryo (2010) - Ernesto
Untamed Virgins (2011)
Hostage ko... Multo! (2011)
Manila Kingpin: The Asiong Salonga Story (2011) - Hepe Villagonzalo
Moron 5 and the Crying Lady (2012) - Father of Mozart
My Naughty Kid: Huwag Kang Pasaway (2012) - Lolo
Tiktik: The Aswang Chronicles (2012) - Capt. Rain Regalado
El Presidente (2012)
The Fighting Chefs (2013) - Atty. Cortes
Raketeros (2013) - Berto's Father
DOTA: Nakakabaliw (2014) - (Last Film Appearance)

Television 
Labs Ko Si Babe (1999)
!Oka Tokat (2000)
Panday (2005) - Emong
Maria Flordeluna (2007) - Tibor Natividad
Someone to Love (2009) - Mr. Gonzales
Kahit Puso'y Masugatan (2012) - Major
Aso ni San Roque (2012) - General
Forever (2013) - Atty. Barabas
Wagas (2013) - Warden Alimurong / Chesco's Father (Last TV Appearance)

Awards and nominations 

 Nominated for 1970 FAMAS Award for Best Supporting Actor for Nasaan ang Katarungan?
 Nominated for 1978 FAMAS Award for Best Supporting Actor for Burlesk Queen

References

External links

1948 births
2014 deaths
20th-century Filipino male actors
21st-century Filipino male actors
ABS-CBN personalities
Converts to evangelical Christianity from Roman Catholicism
Filipino male film actors
Filipino male television actors
Filipino Christians
Filipino evangelicals